A kiva is a room used by modern Puebloan people for religious rituals.

Kiva or KIVA may also refer to:

 Kiva (name), a list of people with the name

Television
 KIVA (TV), a defunct television station in Yuma, Arizona
 KOBF, a television station in Farmington, New Mexico, which held the call sign KIVA-TV from 1972 to 1983
 Kamen Rider Kiva, a 2008 Japanese tokusatsu series

Radio
 KIVA (AM), a radio station (1600 AM) licensed to Albuquerque, New Mexico, US
 KKRG-FM, a radio station (105.1 FM) licensed to Santa Fe, New Mexico, which held the call sign KIVA from 1985 to 1987, and the call sign KIVA-FM from 1987 to 1992
 KSSR-FM, a radio station (95.9 FM) licensed to Santa Rosa, New Mexico, known as KIVA from 2002 to 2009
 KQNM, a radio station (1550 AM) licensed to Albuquerque, New Mexico, which held the call sign KIVA from 2009 to 2012

Organisations
 Kiva (organization), a non-profit organization that promotes development through microcredit
 Kiva Systems, now Amazon Robotics, an automated warehousing systems and robotics company

Places
 False Kiva, human-made stone circle of unknown origin
 Kiva Auditorium, part of the Albuquerque Convention Center
 Kiva Dunes, a golf course in Alabama, United States
 Kiva, Estonia, a village in Estonia
 Khanate of Kiva, a former Central Asian kingdom
 Kiva, Michigan, an unincorporated community in Michigan, United States

Other uses
 Caoimhe, an Irish given name, anglicised Kiva
 Kiva (album), 1995 ambient music album by Steve Roach, Michael Stearns and Ron Sunsinger
 KIVA (software), a family of Computational Fluid Dynamics software developed by Los Alamos National Laboratory

See also
 Khiva (disambiguation)
 Kivas Tully (1820–1905), Irish-Canadian architect